Franz Kunz was a Swiss skier. He competed in the military patrol at the 1928 Summer Olympics.

References

External links

Date of birth missing
Place of birth missing
Date of death missing
Place of death missing
Swiss military patrol (sport) runners
Military patrol competitors at the 1928 Winter Olympics
Winter Olympics competitors for Switzerland